The 1940 Memorial Cup final was the 22nd junior ice hockey championship of the Canadian Amateur Hockey Association. The George Richardson Memorial Trophy champions Oshawa Generals of the Ontario Hockey Association in Eastern Canada competed against the Abbott Cup champions Kenora Thistles of the Manitoba Junior Hockey League in Western Canada. In a best-of-five series, held at Shea's Amphitheatre in Winnipeg, Manitoba, Oshawa won their 2nd and consecutive Memorial Cup, defeating Kenora 3 games to 1.

Scores
Game 1: Oshawa 1-0 Kenora
Game 2: Oshawa 4-1 Kenora
Game 3: Kenora 4-3 Oshawa
Game 4: Oshawa 4-2 Kenora

Winning roster
Don Daniels, Frank Eddolls, Jack Hewson, Bud Hellyer, Nick Knott, Jud McAtee, Norm McAtee, Dinny McManus, Gar Peters, Nig Ritchie, Roy Sawyer, Orville Smith, Doug Turner, Ron Wilson, Wally Wilson.  Coach: Tracy Shaw

References

External links
 Memorial Cup
 Canadian Hockey League

1939–40 in Canadian ice hockey
Memorial Cup tournaments
Ice hockey in Winnipeg